Gadolinium(III) fluoride is an inorganic compound with a chemical formula GdF3.

Production 
Gadolinium(III) fluoride can be produced by heating gadolinium oxide and ammonium bifluoride. The reaction involves two steps:
 Gd2O3 + 6 NH4HF2 → 2 NH4GdF4 + 4 NH4F + 3 H2O
 NH4GdF4 → GdF3 + NH3 + HF

Alternatively, reacting gadolinium chloride with hydrofluoric acid and adding hot water produces GdF3·xH2O (x＝0.53). Anhydrous gadolinium(III) fluoride can then be produced by heating the hydrate with ammonium bifluoride; without the bifluoride, GdOF is formed instead.
 GdCl3 + 3 HF + x H2O → GdF3·xH2O + 3 HCl

References 

Gadolinium compounds
Fluorides
Lanthanide halides